Pichia pastoris is a species of methylotrophic yeast. It was found in the 1960s, with its feature of using methanol as a source of carbon and energy. After years of study, P. pastoris was widely used in biochemical research and biotech industries. With strong potential for being an expression system for protein production, as well as being a model organism for genetic study,  P. pastoris has become important for biological research and biotech applications. In the last decade, some reports reassigned P. pastoris to the genus Komagataella with phylogenetic analysis, by genome sequencing of P. pastoris. The genus was split into K. phaffii, K. pastoris, and K. pseudopastoris.

P. pastoris in nature

Natural habitat
In nature, P. pastoris is found on trees, such as chestnut trees. They are heterotrophs and they can use several carbon sources for living, like glucose, glycerol and methanol.  However, they cannot use lactose.

Reproduction
P. pastoris can undergo both asexual reproduction and sexual reproduction, by budding and ascospore. In this case, two types of cells of P. pastoris exist: haploid and diploid cells. In the asexual life cycle, haploid cells undergo mitosis for reproduction. In the sexual life cycle, diploid cells undergo sporulation and meiosis.  The growth rate of its colonies can vary by a large range, from near to 0 to a doubling time of one hour, which is suitable for industrial processes.

P. pastoris as a model organism
In the last few years, P. pastoris was investigated and identified as a good model organism with several advantages. First of all, P. pastoris can be grown and used easily in lab. Like other widely used yeast models, it has relatively short life span and fast regeneration time. Moreover, some inexpensive culture media have been designed, so that P. pastoris can grow quickly on them, with high cell density.
Whole genome sequencing for P. pastoris had been performed. The P. pastoris GS115 genome has been sequenced by the Flanders Institute for Biotechnology and Ghent University, and published in Nature Biotechnology. The genome sequence and gene annotation can be browsed through the ORCAE system. The complete genomic data allows scientists to identify homologous proteins and evolutionary relationships between other yeast species and P. pastoris. Furthermore, P. pastoris are single eukaryotic cells, which means researchers could investigate the proteins inside P. pastoris. Then the homologous comparison to other more complicated eukaryotic species can be processed, to obtain their functions and origins.

Another advantage of P. pastoris is its similarity to the well-studied yeast model — Saccharomyces cerevisiae. As a model organism for biology, S. cerevisiae have been well studied for decades and used by researchers for various purposes throughout history. The two yeast genera; Pichia and Saccharomyces, have similar growth conditions and tolerances; thus, the culture of P. pastoris can be adopted by labs without many modifications. Moreover, unlike S. cerevisiae, P. pastoris has the ability to functionally process proteins with large molecular weight, which is useful in a translational host.
Considering all the advantages, P. pastoris can be usefully employed as both a genetic and experimental model organism.

P. pastoris as a genetic model organism
As a genetic model organism, P. pastoris can be used for genetic analysis and large-scale genetic crossing, with complete genome data and its ability to carry out complex eukaryotic genetic processing in a relatively small genome. The functional genes for peroxisome assembly were investigated by comparing wild-type and mutant strains of P. pastoris.

P. pastoris as an experimental model organism
As an experimental model organism, P. pastoris was mainly used as the host system for transformation. Due to its abilities of recombination with foreign DNA and processing large proteins, much research has been carried out to investigate the possibility of producing new proteins and the function of artificially designed proteins, using P. pastoris as a transformation host. In the last decade, P. pastoris was engineered to build expression system platforms, which is a typical application for a standard experimental model organism, as described below.

P. pastoris as expression system platform
P. pastoris is frequently used as an expression system for the production of heterologous proteins. Several properties make P. pastoris suited for this task. Currently, several strains of  P. pastoris are used for biotechnical purposes, with significant differences among them in growth and protein production. Some common variants possess a mutation in the HIS4 gene, leading to the selection of cells which are transformed successfully with expression vectors. The technology for vector integration into P. pastoris genome is similar to that in Saccharomyces cerevisiae.

Advantage
1:P. pastoris  is able to grow on simple, inexpensive medium, with high growth rate. P. pastoris can grow in either shake flasks or a fermenter, which makes it suitable for both small- and large-scale production.

2:P. pastoris has two alcohol oxidase genes, Aox1 and Aox2, which include strongly inducible promoters. These two genes allow Pichia to use methanol as a carbon and energy source. The AOX promoters are induced by methanol, and repressed by glucose. Usually, the gene for the desired protein is introduced under the control of the Aox1 promoter, which means that protein production can be induced by the addition of methanol on medium. After several researches, scientists found that the promotor derived from AOX1 gene in P. pastoris is extremely suitable to control the expression of foreign genes, which had been transformed into the P. pastoris genome, producing heterologous proteins.

3: With a key trait, P. pastoris can grow with extremely high cell density on the culture. This feature is compatible with heterologous protein expression, giving higher yields of production.

4: The technology required for genetic manipulation of P. pastoris is similar to that of Saccharomyces cerevisiae, which is one of the most well-studied yeast model organisms. As a result, the experiment protocol and materials are easy to build for P. pastoris.

Disadvantage
As some proteins require chaperonin for proper folding, Pichia is unable to produce a number of proteins, since P. pastoris does not contain the appropriate chaperones. The technologies of introducing genes of mammalian chaperonins into the yeast genome and overexpressing existing chaperonins still require improvement.

Comparison with other expression systems
In standard molecular biology research, the bacterium Escherichia coli is the most frequently used organism for expression system, to produce heterologous proteins, due to its features of fast growth rate, high protein production rate, as well as undemanding growth conditions. Protein production in E. coli is usually faster than that in P. pastoris, with reasons: Competent E. coli cells can be stored frozen, and thawed before use, whereas Pichia cells have to be produced immediately before use. Expression yields in Pichia vary between different clones, so that a large number of clones has to be screened for protein production, to find the best producer. The biggest advantage of Pichia over E. coli is that Pichia is capable of forming disulfide bonds and glycosylations in proteins, but E. coli cannot.  E. coli might produce a misfolded protein when disulfides are included in final product, leading to inactive or insoluble forms of proteins.

The well-studied Saccharomyces cerevisiae is also used as an expression system with similar advantages over E. coli as Pichia. However Pichia has two main advantages over S. cerevisiae in laboratory and industrial settings:
Pichia, as mentioned above, is a methylotroph, meaning that it can grow with the simple methanol, as the only source of energy — Pichia can grow fast in cell suspension with reasonably strong methanol solution, which would kill most other micro-organisms. In this case, the expression system is cheap to set up and maintain.
Pichia can grow up to a very high cell density. Under ideal conditions, it can multiply to the point where the cell suspension is practically a paste. As the protein yield from expression system in a microbe is roughly equal to the product of the proteins produced per cell, which makes Pichia of great use when trying to produce large quantities of protein without expensive equipment.

Comparing to other expression systems, such as S2-cells from Drosophila melanogaster and Chinese hamster ovary cells, Pichia usually gives much better yields. Generally, cell lines from multicellular organisms require complex and expensive types of media, including amino acids, vitamins, as well as other growth factors. These types of media significantly increase the cost of producing heterologous proteins. Additionally, since Pichia can grow in media containing only one carbon source and one nitrogen source, which is suitable for isotopic labelling applications, like protein NMR.

Industrial applications
P. pastoris have been used in several kinds of biotech industries, such as pharmaceutical industry. All the applications are based on its feature of expressing proteins.

Biotherapeutic production
In the last few years, Pichia pastoris had been used for the production of over 500 types of biotherapeutics, such as IFNγ. At the beginning, one drawback of this protein expression system is the over-glycosylation with high density of mannose structure, which is a potential cause of immunogenicity. In 2006, a research group managed to create a new strain called YSH597. This strain can express erythropoietin in its normal glycosylation form, by exchanging the enzymes responsible for the fungal type glycosylation, with the mammalian homologs. Thus, the altered glycosylation pattern allowed the protein to be fully functional.

Enzyme production for food industry
In food industries, like brewery and bake house, Pichia pastoris is used to produce different kinds of enzymes, as processing aids and food additives, with many functions. For example, some enzymes produced by genetically modified Pichia pastoris can keep the bread soft. Meanwhile, in beer, enzymes could be used to lower the alcohol concentration.

References 

Saccharomycetaceae
Fungal models
Yeasts
Fungi described in 1956